Synsphyronus is a genus of pseudoscorpions in the family Garypidae, which has been found in Australia (including Tasmania), New Zealand and New Caledonia.

Species
 Synsphyronus absitus Harvey, 1987
 Synsphyronus amplissimus Harvey, 1987
 Synsphyronus apimelus Harvey, 1987
 Synsphyronus attiguus Harvey, 1987
 Synsphyronus bounites Harvey, 1987
 Synsphyronus callus Hoff, 1947
 Synsphyronus christopherdarwini Harvey, 2011
 Synsphyronus dewae Beier, 1969
 Synsphyronus dorothyae Harvey, 1987
 Synsphyronus ejuncidus Harvey, 1987
 Synsphyronus elegans Beier, 1954
 Synsphyronus ellenae Harvey, 2011
 Synsphyronus francesae Harvey, 2011
 Synsphyronus gigas Beier, 1971
 Synsphyronus gracilis Harvey, 1987
 Synsphyronus greensladeae Harvey, 1987
 Synsphyronus gurdoni Harvey, Abrams and Burger, 2015
 Synsphyronus hadronennus Harvey, 1987
 Synsphyronus hansenii (With, 1908)
 Synsphyronus heptatrichus Harvey, 1987
 Synsphyronus lathrius Harvey, 1987
 Synsphyronus leo Harvey, 1987
 Synsphyronus lineatus Beier, 1966
 Synsphyronus magnus Hoff, 1947
 Synsphyronus meganennus Harvey, 1987
 Synsphyronus melanochelatus (Chamberlin, 1930)
 Synsphyronus mimetus Chamberlin, 1943
 Synsphyronus mimulus Chamberlin, 1943
 Synsphyronus niger Hoff, 1947
 Synsphyronus nullarborensis Beier, 1969
 Synsphyronus paradoxus Chamberlin, 1930
 Synsphyronus silveirai Harvey, 1987

References 

Pseudoscorpions
Taxa described in 1930
Pseudoscorpion genera